The 2014–15 A Group was the 91st season of the top division of the Bulgarian football league system, and 67th since a league format was adopted for the national competition of A Group as a top tier of the pyramid.

The competition was divided in two phases - Regular season, with every team playing against every other team twice, and Playoffs, with teams divided into Championship group (top six) and Relegation group (bottom six) to determine the champions and the relegated teams, respectively.

Ludogorets Razgrad entered the season as three-time defending champions, and succeeded to retain the title for a 4th consecutive and overall time 2 rounds before the end of the season, after their home win over Lokomotiv Sofia.

Beroe Stara Zagora finished second, while Lokomotiv Sofia claimed the third place.

Marek Dupnitsa and Haskovo survived only one season in A Group and were relegated. This season was controversial, because both CSKA Sofia and Lokomotiv Sofia were relegated to the third tier of Bulgarian football, due to financial problems, which prevented them from obtaining a professional license for the next season. This was the first time that CSKA was relegated from the top flight since 1948, which meant rivals Levski remained the only club to have never been relegated. Lokomotiv on the other hand, was relegated for the first time since 1971.

Competition format
The championship is divided in two phases. 
In the first phase, the Regular season, every team must play two times against each of the other eleven teams on home-away basis for a subtotal of 22 matches.

In the second phase, the Play-offs, the teams are divided in two groups - Championship group (first six) and Relegation group (bottom six). In those two parallel played groups every team has to play two times, again on home-away basis, only against the remaining five teams in the group for a subtotal of 10 matches.

Thus, the season has a total of 32 fixtures.

At the end of the season, the champion earns a place in the 2015/16 UEFA Champions League qualifying rounds, while the next two or three clubs in the final standings in the league table (depending on the winner of the 2014–15 Bulgarian Cup) earn the right to play in 2015/16 UEFA Europa League qualifying rounds. The last two teams in the table (from 11th to 12th place) are directly relegated to B Group for the next season while two clubs from the lower division are promoted.

Teams
A total of 12 teams are contesting the league, including the best 10 sides from the previous season, plus two promoted clubs from the lower  division B Group.

As finishing in the bottom four places of the table at the end of season 2013–14, Chernomorets, Neftochimic, Pirin (Gotse Delchev) and Lyubimets 2007 were relegated to B Group and only two teams were promoted from B Group with the object of decreasing the number of teams from 14 to 12 for the current season.

The relegated teams were replaced by Marek Dupnitsa, the 2013–14 B Group champions and Haskovo, the 2013–14 B Group runner-up. While Marek returns to the top division after six years, Haskovo reaches again the highest class after 21 years.

Stadia and locations
Note: Table lists in alphabetical order.

Personnel and sponsoring
Note: Flags indicate national team as has been defined under FIFA eligibility rules. Players and Managers may hold more than one non-FIFA nationality.

Managerial changes

First phase
The first 22 Rounds comprise the first phase of the season, also called the Regular season. In the first phase, every team plays each other team twice on a home-away basis till all the teams have played two matches against each other. The table standings at the end of the Regular season determine the group in which each team is going to play in the Play-offs.

League table

Results
Each team played against every other team for a total of 22 matches.

Round by round

Second phase

After the first 22 Rounds comprising the Regular season, the teams are divided into two groups of six determined by their standings in the table at the end of the Regular season. The second phase is also referred to as the Play-offs. The teams in each group of the Play-offs again play on a home-away basis but only with the teams in their respective group. Hence, the total number of games each team has to play in this phase is 10 (twice with each of the other five teams in the group).

Championship group
The top six teams at the end of the Regular season play in the Championship group to determine the champion for the season. Additionally, the teams in this group compete for the Bulgarian spots in UEFA's 2015–16 editions of Champions League and Europa League.

At the end of the Play-offs, the team placed first in the group can compete in the qualifying rounds of 2015–16 UEFA Champions League. The second and the third placed teams earn the right to compete in the qualifying rounds of 2015–16 UEFA Europa League. If the winner of the 2014–15 Bulgarian Cup is one of those top three teams, the fourth placed team in the group also earns a right to participate in the qualifying rounds of the Europa League.

Relegation group
The bottom six teams at the end of the Regular season play in the Relegation group to determine which two teams are relegated to B PFG for next season.

At the end of the Play-offs the bottom two teams of this group will be directly relegated.

Season statistics

Top scorers

Updated on 26 May 2015

Hat-tricks

Updated on 26 May 2015

Awards

Weekly awards

Player of the Round

Monthly awards

Player of the Month

Transfers
List of Bulgarian football transfers summer 2014
List of Bulgarian football transfers winter 2014–15

References

2014-15
Bul
1